The Good Life is the debut studio album by Justin Townes Earle, released on March 25, 2008 on Bloodshot Records.

Critical reception

The Good Life received fairly good reviews from music critics. PopMatters Juli Thanki states in her review that "On his first full length record, The Good Life, Justin Townes Earle delivers the best debut roots music has seen since Old Crow Medicine Show hit the big time with OCMS in 2004".

Track listing

Personnel
Justin Townes Earle – lead vocals, acoustic guitar, harmonica, guitar [tremolo] and baritone guitar
Bryn Davies – acoustic bass, cello and harmony vocals
Chris Scruggs – lap steel guitar
Cory Younts – harmony Vocals, mandolin and harmonica
Josh Hedley – fiddle, viola and harmony vocals
Steve Poulton – electric guitar
Brad Jones – electric bass and organ
Brian Owings – drums
Ben Martin – drums
Keith Brogdon – drums
Dustin Welch – banjo and backing vocals
Elliott Currie – backing vocals
Travis Nicholson – backing vocals
Amanda Shires - cover model

Chart performance

References

2008 albums
Bloodshot Records albums
Justin Townes Earle albums